Justiniana Nova or Nova Justiniana may refer to one of several sites named after Justinian I or Justinian II:

 Dara (Mesopotamia), renamed after Justinian I rebuilt it
 Erdek, renamed after the settlement of Cypriot refugees there by Justinian II

See also 
 Justinianopolis (disambiguation)
 Justiniana (disambiguation)